Edward "Ned" Corvan (c. 1830 – 1865) was a Tyneside concert hall songwriter and performer, and a contemporary of George "Geordie" Ridley. His songs were printed in a modified English orthography designed to represent the traditional dialect of Tyneside in the middle of the 19th century, and are examples of Dialect Literature.

Biography
Corvan was born in Liverpool some time around 1830, but his family moved to Newcastle Upon Tyne when he was four years old. His father died three years later.

Corvan was raised by his widowed mother who struggled to feed the family of four on her meagre earnings. After a brief career as a sail-maker Corvan joined Billy Purvis's Victoria Theatre. Here he tried his hand at a number of things, but found most success in the performance of local and comic songs. Ned then went on to join the Olympic where he enjoyed great success with songs such as "Astrilly". With this popularity he travelled the North singing his Tyneside songs, eventually settling in South Shields where he operated Corvan's Music Hall. After a number of years he gave up the establishment and returned to local singing.

Playing successfully at concerts "of the free and easy type ... not specially noted for their refinement", he was respected as "a really expert violinist" and "unequalled ... as a comic singer of local ditties".

He also "possessed very considerable gifts as an artist", often creating chalk likenesses of contemporary celebrities and local figures as part of his act.

Corvan sang about survival on the edge of poverty and other working class experiences. He supported the seamen's strike of 1851 and gave money from his performances to seafarers charities. He sang not only for workers, but also "on behalf of – and in effect, from within – that network of communities" from which he came, and with which he still felt an attachment.

Corvan was married to Isabella Arrowsmith and they had three children.

Corvan died of tuberculosis on 31 August 1865 at the age of 35.

Works
Corvan's songs were published in four Song Books, a collection called Random Rhymes, in various Broadsides, and in editions of Allan's Illustrated Edition of Tyneside Songs and Readings.

Random Rhymes (1850)
The Queen's Second Visit
Billy Purvis turned Ranter Preacher
The Curds and Cream-house Ghost
He wad be a Noodle
Yer Gannin to be a Keelman
The Happy Keelman
The rise in Baccy
The Shades Saloon
The Goose Club
Bella Gray - A Parody on Rosa Lee
O, maw bonnie Nannie O
Parody on She Wore a Wreath of Roses
Sweating System
Tom Johnson
Campbell's grand Saloon, North Shields
The Folks of Aud Shields
The New Mayor of South Shields
South Shields Corporation
Blyth in a Breeze

Broadsides (1850–1865)
Warkworth Feast
Toon Improvement Bill; or, Nee Pleyce Noo to Play
The Sandgate Lass
The Rise in Coals
The Pitman and the Kippered Herrin'''The Keel on FireThe Stage Struck KeelmanBella GrayAstrilly's Goold Fields; or, Tommy Carr's LetterThe Unfortunate ManThe Factory Lass or Pally JonesSwaggering at the RacesHe Wad Be a NoodleTrip to Marsden RockMaw Stepmother or, Billy Bag the GluttonDays When I was Hard UpHairy Gobs! an' Fine Moosecatchers!The Queen's Second Visit, or, The Openin' o' wor Greet Central StationPrince Alberts' Babby Hoose, or The Greet Exhibition of 1851The Cullercoats Fish-Wife£4. 10s. or, the Sailors' StrikeThe Funny Time CominCorvan's Song Books (1857–1866)Corvan's Song Book No. 1Swaggering at the Races
The Keel on Fire
The Rise in Coals
Astrilly, or The Pitman's Farewell
Nee Pleyce noo to Play
The Pitman and the Kippered Herrin
Warkworth Feast
Astrilly's Goold Fields, or Tommy Carr's Letter
The Unfortunate Man
The Sandgate Lass
Pally Jones the Factory LassCorvan's Song Book No. 2He wad be a Noodle
Maw Step-Mother; or, Billy Bags the Glutton
Days when I was Hard Up
Tommy Carr's Adventures in Astrilly
Deeth o' Billy Purvis
Stage Struck Keelman
Lads o' Tyneside
Hairy Gobs an' fine Moosecatchers
Trip to Marsden Rock
Gallowgate HoppinCorvan's Song Book No. 3Bella Gray
The Queen's Second Visit
Prince Albert's Babby Hoose; or, the Greet Exhibition of 1851
The Cullercoats Fish-Wife
Peep at Newcassel
Widow Winks
Snooks, the Artist
O, ha'e ye seen wor JimmyCorvan's Song Book No. 4'''Newcassel Pluck, or Recruitin' for DelhiSoup KitchenGossipin' Nan ToddsPerils of the Mine, or Collier's DeathSunday Mornin's Fuddle - a parodyWork for One Thousand MenJimmy Munro's TroublesPea StrawTom SayersBobby Walker's Visit to the LeviathanOur Mary Ann - a parodySword Dancers' LamentIn Allan's Tyneside SongsThe CallerHe Wad Be a NoodleThe Toon Improvement Bill, or, Ne Pleyce Noo te PlayThe Rise in CoalsAsstrilly; or, The Pitman's Farewell Asstrilly's Goold Fields; or, Tommy Carr's LetterTommy Carr's Adventures in AsstrillyThe Cullercoats Fish-WifeBobby the BoxerWarkworth FeastThe Kipper'd Herrin
Deeth o' Billy Purvis
The Greet Bull-dog o' Shields
The Fishermen Hung the Monkey, O!
The Comet; or, The Skipper's Fright
The Fire on the Kee
Chambers and White
The Deeth o' Cuckoo Jack
Wor Tyneside Champions
The Queen Has Sent a Letter; or, The Hartley Calamity
The Queen's Visit to Cherbourg
Stage-struck Keelman
The Soop Kithcin
The High Level and the Aud Bridge
Cat-gut Jim, The Fiddler
(The Curds-and-Cream House Ghost)

Other
Mally's Dream
Tyne Lads For Ever!
Jimmy McKenny

Corvan's dialect

Although Corvan was not born a Geordie, he was considered "a consummate master of the patois of Tyneside". Almost all of Corvan's works are examples of the traditional dialect of Tyneside (known as Geordie) in the mid-19th century.

References

External links
https://web.archive.org/web/20100206175536/http://www.asaplive.com/archive/browse_by_collection.asp FARNE - Folk Archive Resource North East

1830s births
Year of birth uncertain
1865 deaths
English male singer-songwriters
Musicians from Newcastle upon Tyne
Geordie songwriters
19th-century British male singers